Maecheon High School is a high school in Daegu, South Korea. The plan to establish the school was approved on 25 May 2006, and on 4 March 2008, the first entrance ceremony was held. The motto of the school is "Become needed person".

Maecheon High School's four educational goals are:
to grow a creative person leading a future society,
to grow a faithful, hard-working and moral person
to grow a mentally and physically healthy person, and
to grow future-oriented person to lead a global society of the Digital Age.

External links

Educational institutions established in 2008
High schools in Daegu
2008 establishments in South Korea